Andre Ahrle is a racing driver born in Germany.

In 2001 he drove in the FIA GT Championship for the Larbre Porsche team, on a Porsche 996 GT3-R. He also filled in for other drivers in various series in 1999, 2000 and 2002.

Ahrle also took part in several 24 Hours of Le Mans from 1996 to 2002.

External links
https://web.archive.org/web/20050219061148/http://www.fiagt.com/driverinfo.php?drivername=Andre+Ahrle

German racing drivers
Living people
24 Hours of Le Mans drivers
Porsche Supercup drivers
24 Hours of Daytona drivers
Year of birth missing (living people)

Larbre Compétition drivers
FIA GT Championship drivers